The 2011–12 FIS Nordic Combined World Cup was the 29th world cup season, a combination of ski jumping and cross-country skiing organized by FIS. It started on 25 November 2011 in Kuusamo, Finland and ended on 10 March 2012 in Oslo, Norway.

Calendar

Men

Team

Standings

Overall 

Standings after 23 events.

Nations Cup 

Standings after 26 events.

Achievements
First World Cup career victory
, 24, in his 4th season – the WC 1 in Kuusamo; it also was his first podium
, 32, in his 10th season – the WC 3 in Lillehammer; it also was his first podium
, 28, in his 11th season – the WC 5 in Ramsau; first podium was 2008–09 WC 7 in Ramsau
, 21, in his 5th season – the WC 10 in Chaux-Neuve; first podium was 2009–10 WC 6 in Ramsau
, 23, in his 7th season – the WC 14 in Val di Fiemme; first podium was 2009–10 WC 15 in Seefeld
, 25, in his 4th season – the WC 23 in Oslo; it also was his first podium

First World Cup podium
, 20, in his 2nd season – no. 3 in the WC 8 in Seefeld
, 21, in his 4th season – no. 3 in the WC 10 in Chaux-Neuve
, 30, in his 9th season – no. 3 in the WC 18 in Klingenthal
, 31, in his 12th season – no. 3 in the WC 19 in Liberec

Victory in this World Cup (in brackets victory for all time)
 , 5 (20) first places
 , 3 (4) first places
 , 3 (3) first place
 , 3 (3) first place
 , 2 (2) first place
 , 1 (3) first places
 , 1 (3) first places
 , 1 (2) first places
 , 1 (1) first place
 , 1 (1) first place
 , 1 (1) first place

Notes

References

External links
FIS-Ski Home Nordic Combined – Official Web Site

FIS Nordic Combined World Cup, 2011-12
FIS Nordic Combined World Cup
2012 in Nordic combined